During the 1996–97 English football season, Swansea City competed in the Football League Third Division, following relegation from the Second Division.

Season summary
In the 1996–97 season, Swansea reached the final of the 1997 Third Division play-offs for promotion, but lost to 1–0 to Northampton Town, whose goal came from a re-taken free kick by John Frain in the final minute.

Kit

Final league table

Squad
Squad at end of season

Left club during season

Transfers

In

Out

References

1996
Welsh football clubs 1996–97 season
1996–97 Football League Third Division by team